Régis Ribeiro de Souza (born 3 June 1989), simply known as Régis, is a Brazilian professional footballer who plays as a right-back.

Career
Born in Brasília, Distrito Federal, Régis made his senior debuts with Legião. Shortly after he joined CFZ de Brasília, and after some good performances he moved to Goiás in the 2009 summer.

Régis was released by the Esmeraldino at the end of the 2009 season, and joined Americana in early 2010. In the following year he signed with São Bernardo FC, and was loaned to Marcílio Dias and Paysandu in February and May 2012, respectively. He returned to São Bernardo in September, after not receiving wages.

On 21 May 2013 Régis signed with Ponte Preta. On 4 August he made his Série A debut, starting in a 1–1 home draw against Fluminense.

On 17 January 2014 Régis signed with Portuguesa. After appearing regularly with Lusa he moved to Botafogo on 25 September.

Honours
Campeonato Paulista Série A2: 2011

References

External links
 Régis at playmakerstats.com (English version of ogol.com.br)
 

1989 births
Living people
Brazilian footballers
Footballers from Brasília
Association football defenders
Campeonato Brasileiro Série A players
Campeonato Brasileiro Série B players
Campeonato Brasileiro Série C players
Campeonato Brasileiro Série D players
Goiás Esporte Clube players
Guaratinguetá Futebol players
São Bernardo Futebol Clube players
Paysandu Sport Club players
Associação Atlética Ponte Preta players
Associação Portuguesa de Desportos players
Botafogo de Futebol e Regatas players
Capivariano Futebol Clube players
São Paulo FC players
Legião Futebol Clube players
Clube Náutico Marcílio Dias players
Red Bull Brasil players
Luverdense Esporte Clube players
Guarani FC players
Esporte Clube São Bento players
Grêmio Esportivo Juventus players
Sociedade Esportiva do Gama players
Nacional Fast Clube players
Sampaio Corrêa Futebol e Esporte players
Volta Redonda FC players
Agremiação Sportiva Arapiraquense players
Clube Recreativo e Atlético Catalano players